The 1983–84 Biathlon World Cup was a multi-race tournament over a season of biathlon, organised by the UIPMB (Union Internationale de Pentathlon Moderne et Biathlon). The season started on 6 January 1984 in Falun, Sweden, and ended on 11 March 1984 in Lygna, Norway. It was the seventh season of the Biathlon World Cup.

Men's calendar
Below is the World Cup calendar for the 1983–84 season.

 1984 Winter Olympics races were not included in the 1983–84 World Cup scoring system.

*The relays were technically unofficial races as they did not count towards anything in the World Cup.

Women's calendar

*The relays were technically unofficial races as they did not count towards anything in the World Cup.

World Cup Podium

Men

Women

Standings: Men

Overall 

Final standings after 10 races.

Standings: Women

Overall 

Final standings after 8 races.

Achievements
First World/European Cup career victory
, 25, in her 2nd season — the WC 2 Individual in Ruhpolding; it also was her first podium
, 20, in his 2nd season — the WC 4 Individual in Oberhof; it also was his first podium
, 24, in her 2nd season — the EC 3 Individual in Lygna; first podium was 1983–84 Sprint in Falun
, 23, — the EC 3 Sprint in Lygna; first podium was 1983–84 Sprint in Falun

First World/European Cup podium
, 26, in his 2nd season — no. 2 in the WC 1 Sprint in Falun
, 23, — no. 2 in the EC 1 Sprint in Falun
, 24, in her 2nd season — no. 3 in the EC 1 Sprint in Falun
, 21, in his 3rd season — no. 3 in the WC 2 Individual in Pontresina
, 22, in his 3rd season — no. 3 in the WC 2 Sprint in Pontresina
, 24, in his 3rd season — no. 3 in the WC 3 Individual in Ruhpolding
, 25, — no. 2 in the EC 3 Sprint in Lygna

Victory in this World/European Cup (all-time number of victories in parentheses)
, 3 (4) first places
, 2 (7) first places
, 2 (3) first places
, 1 (4) first place
, 1 (2) first place
, 1 (2) first place
, 1 (2) first place
, 1 (2) first place
, 1 (1) first place
, 1 (1) first place
, 1 (1) first place
, 1 (1) first place

Retirements
Following notable biathletes retired after the 1983–84 season:

Notes
1.  In the individual races in Falun some non-World Cup racers participated. In the 20 km individual Andrei Zenkov and Øivind Nerhagen, among others, were non-World Cup racers, and so for World Cup purposes Arto Jääskeläinen came 7th, and Rolf Storsveen and Kjell Søbak finished 9th and 10th respectively and received the appropriate World Cup points. In the 10 km sprint, one of the non-World Cup racers was Sergei Bulygin, and so he did not receive any World Cup points, and for World Cup purposes Algimantas Šalna won that race and received the appropriate World Cup points. Also in the European Cup races there were some non-European Cup racers participating, among those were Anita Nygård who finished 10th in the 5 km sprint. For European Cup purposes though, Siv Bråten finished 10th and received the appropriate points.
2.  The Aftenposten source says that the relay teams received a very unusual amount of penalty loops, with 12, 13, 21, 20, 25 and 25 penalty loops respectively for the first six teams. However, in the same paper, it says that the two Norwegian teams got 14 penalty loops combined, which does not add up with it saying that the "Norway I" team got 25 penalties. So those high numbers probably refers to the number of missed shots.
3.  In the individual races here some non-World Cup racers participated. Among those was Gisle Fenne, he was not a World Cup racer and so did not receive any World Cup points, and for World Cup purposes Risto Punkka came fifth and received the appropriate World Cup points.
4. The Sports Book does originally have different order of the finishers in this 10 km race with B. Mestad, Mikkola and Schill coming 8th, 9th and 10th, respectively. However it later contradicts itself by giving the points of those positions to Grønlid, B. Mestad and Anne-L. Engstrøm instead. Because that table shows how each racers score adds up, that has been given precedent.
5.  In the individual races here some non-European Cup racers participated. Among those was Ingeborg Nordmo Krokstad in the 10 km individual, she was not a European Cup racer and so did not receive any points, and for European Cup purposes Doris Niva came 9th and received the appropriate points, with Anne L. Engstrøm finishing 10th. And in 5 km sprint Liv Høgli was also a non-European Cup racer and thus for European Cup purposes those who finished behind her moves up a spot with Doris Niva finishing 4th and Anne L. Engstrøm finishing 10th.

References

Biathlon World Cup
World Cup